Brzeziny  is a village in the administrative district of Gmina Szydłów, within Staszów County, Świętokrzyskie Voivodeship, in south-central Poland.

The village has a population of  389.

Demography 
According to the 2002 Poland census, there were 409 people residing in Brzeziny village, of whom 52.3% were male and 47.7% were female. In the village, the population was spread out, with 24.9% under the age of 18, 33.3% from 18 to 44, 18.3% from 45 to 64, and 23.5% who were 65 years of age or older.
 Figure 1. Population pyramid of village in 2002 – by age group and sex

References

Villages in Staszów County